Buxted Parish Council governs the village of Buxted, a civil parish in the Wealden district of East Sussex in England. The council appoints one councillor who is then known as the Chairman or Chairwoman. The current Chairperson is Councillor Vivienne Blandford.

Buxted Parish Council is formed of two wards - these wards are currently represented by twelve parish councillors.

Clockwise, from the north, it borders the communities of Crowborough, Five Ashes, Heathfield, Buxted & Uckfield.

Current composition

Election history
Buxted Parish Council is made up of up to 15 councillors elected from two wards. The last elections were held in 2015, and resulted in the election of 12 Independent councillors.

2015 election
The 2015 Buxted Parish Council elections were held alongside the elections for Wealden District Council & the Wealden Parliamentary constituency on 7 May 2015. All 15 seats were up for election, of these seats only 12 were filled.

2011 election
In the 2011 Buxted Parish Council elections 15 seats were contested, all of these seats were filled by independent candidates.

2007 election
In the 2007 Buxted Parish Council elections an uncontested election occurred in which 12 of the 15 available seats were filled by independents.

2003 election
In the 2003 Buxted Parish Council elections an uncontested election occurred in which 10 seats were filled by independents.

References

Parish councils of England
Local authorities in East Sussex
Parish Council